This is a list of presidential trips made by Emmanuel Macron as the 25th President of France.

This list excludes trips made within Paris, the French capital in which the Élysée Palace, the official residence and principal workplace of the President, is located and Le Touquet, the location of Macron's house. International trips are included. The number of visits per country and department where he travelled are:

Domestic trips:
 One visit to Alpes-Maritimes, Corrèze, Ille-et-Vilaine, Finistère, Guadeloupe, Guyane, Haute-Garonne, Haute-Savoie, Haute-Vienne, Hautes-Alpes, Hautes-Pyrénées, Haut-Rhin, Loir-et-Cher, Loire-Atlantique, Loiret, Lyon Metropolis, Morbihan, Moselle, Pas-de-Calais, Puy-de-Dôme, Saint-Barthélémy, Saint-Martin, Savoie, Somme, Val-de-Marne and Var.
 Two visits to Bas-Rhin, Hauts-de-Seine, Nord and Seine-Maritime.
 Three visits to Bouches-du-Rhône.
 Six visits to Seine-Saint-Denis.
 Eight visits to Yvelines.

International trips:
 One visit to Algeria, Andorra, Austria, Australia, Bulgaria, Burkina Faso, China, Côte d'Ivoire, Estonia, Ghana, Greece, Luxembourg, Niger, Qatar, Romania, Saudi Arabia, South Korea, Sweden, United Arab Emirates, and the United Kingdom.
 Two visits to Morocco, Mali,  Switzerland, Tunisia and the United States.
 Three visits to Italy.
 Five visits to Germany.
 Six visits to Belgium.

2017

May

June

July

August

September

October

November

December

2018

January

February

March

April

May

June

July

August

December

Future trips 

During the visit of the Prime Minister of Israel, Benjamin Netanyahu in Paris on July 16, 2017, Macron says that he will visit his counterpart in Israel.

Multilateral meetings

See also 
 Foreign relations of France
 List of international presidential trips made by Emmanuel Macron
 List of international presidential trips made by François Hollande

References 

Emmanuel Macron